{{Infobox television
| image                = Livedesk.jpg
| camera               =
| picture_format       = 
| audio_format         = 
| runtime              = 1 hour
| creator              = Sky News
| presenter            = Mon-Thu: Charlotte Hawkins Fri: Gillian Joseph
| theme_music_composer = 
| country              = 
| location             = 
| language             = 
| network              = Sky News
| first_aired          = 
| last_aired           = 
| preceded_by          = SunriseSky Today
| followed_by          = Sky TodayAfternoon Live
| related              =  
}}The Live Desk is a news programme which broadcast on Sky News in the United Kingdom from 8 September 2008 to 2011. Originally, The Live Desk aired twice at 9am and 1pm but from 11 January 2011 the Live Desk's 1pm edition was cancelled and subsequently only one edition was broadcast at 9 a.m., presented by Charlotte Hawkins with Gillian Joseph on Friday. The programme was replaced with a standard Sky News bulletin fronted by the same newscasters later in 2011.

Format
The programme was a 60-minute round-up of the day's news, sport, and business, rather than discussions, interviews, or features. It was loosely based on the Fox News Channel show The Live Desk.

The programme was characterized by the opening line "The Live Desk opens now".

Presenters
Originally at the show's launch it aired once a day, between 1pm and 2pm with Colin Brazier presenting, but on 2 February 2009, The Live Desk'' added a morning edition, running between 9am and 10am. From 11 January 2011, the Live Desk's original 1pm edition was axed in favour of a new political show with Adam Boulton and Sarah Hughes; the 9 a.m. edition remained until later 2011, presented by Charlotte Hawkins, Monday-Thursday, with Gillian Joseph on Fridays. When individual programme titles (such as Afternoon Live and Sky News Today) were dropped by Sky News in 2011, The Live desk was replaced with a standard 60-minute news bulletin.

Replacement presenters
When the regular presenters were unavailable the show was hosted by Samantha Simmonds, Sarah Hughes, Stephen Dixon.

References

External links
Sky News website

2008 British television series debuts
2011 British television series endings
Sky News
Sky UK original programming
Sky television news shows